Bordj Emir Khaled Chikh is a town in northern Algeria.

Communes of Aïn Defla Province